Hacker's Olympic Rundown is a British comedy-sports miniseries which aired on CBBC during the 2016 Summer Olympics in Rio de Janeiro. Presented by Scoop character, Hacker T. Dog, each episode features a rundown of the previous day's events with a humorous twist on them. Characters from Hacker Time, Wilf Breadbin and Derek McGee appeared as Hacker's 'roving reporter' and studio crew respectively. The series began on 8 August 2016. 11 episodes aired throughout August. All roles were portrayed by Phil Fletcher and were written by Jaime Wilson and Graham Davies.

Format
Each episode features Hacker T. Dog (Phil Fletcher) as he covers a variety of sports in a comedic fashion, making fun of what was going on. Similar to Harry Hill's TV Burp. He also talked to his 'roving reporter' Wilfred Breadbin (also portrayed by Fletcher) who reported on something that had little to no relation to sports. Crew member Derek McGee (also portrayed by Fletcher) would help Hacker with presenting.

Episodes

Series 1 (2016)

References

External links

British children's comedy television series
2016 British television series debuts
2016 British television series endings
2010s British children's television series
British television shows featuring puppetry
English-language television shows
BBC children's television shows
BBC television comedy